Johann König (born 21 September 1932) is an Austrian gymnast. He competed in eight events at the 1960 Summer Olympics.

References

1932 births
Living people
Austrian male artistic gymnasts
Olympic gymnasts of Austria
Gymnasts at the 1960 Summer Olympics
People from Bregenz
Sportspeople from Vorarlberg
20th-century Austrian people